Alucita plumigera is a species of moth of the family Alucitidae. It is known from Equatorial Guinea.

References

Alucitidae
Moths of Africa
Moths described in 1913
Taxa named by Embrik Strand